TAROM serves the following scheduled and charter year-round and seasonal destinations as of January 2021:

List

References

Lists of airline destinations
SkyTeam destinations